Mount Meridian is an unincorporated community in Marion Township, Putnam County, in the U.S. state of Indiana. It is called Mount Meridian due to its being the highest place in the county and surrounding areas.

History

Mount Meridian was originally named "Carthage", and under the latter name was laid out in 1833. A post office called Mount Meridian was established in 1835, and remained in operation until it was discontinued in 1905.

The Half Way House

The Half Way House was originally built in 1830 on the north side of the Old National Road (US 40) near the town square. The town is roughly halfway between Terre Haute and Indianapolis, hence its name. Such people as Daniel Webster and Abraham Lincoln spent the night there. It was originally built by William Heavin as the Heavin family owned and operated The Lovely Mount Tavern in Radford Virginia, which is where they migrated from. The house was then owned and operated by such people as John David Scott, Thomas and Martha (Bourne) Vermillion, Asbury and Cora (Bourne) McCammack, and was last run by their son, Virgil McCammack. Business slowed by 1940, as the automobile lessened the need of an inn for its location.

Geography 
Mount Meridian is located at 39°36'6.55" North, 86°45'26.06" West (39.601820, -86.757240), southeast of Greencastle.

Points of interest

Putnam Park Road Course

About 1/2 mile southwest of the community is the Putnam Park Road Course. Mainly used as a test track, it holds races, practices and special events for all types of motor vehicles, including motorcycles, Porsche, Dodge Viper, and professional race car drivers of all types and levels. It is also a primary location to test new vehicles and race car models. The track was featured on the Speed Channel in 2007.

References

Unincorporated communities in Putnam County, Indiana
Unincorporated communities in Indiana
National Road